Ahmed Al-Khodhair  (born October 22, 1989) is a Saudi football player who plays as a forward. He appeared in the Pro League for Al-Qadisiyah.

References

1989 births
Living people
Saudi Arabian footballers
Al-Fateh SC players
Al-Qadsiah FC players
Al-Taraji Club players
Al-Nahda Club (Saudi Arabia) players
Al-Diriyah Club players
Al-Nojoom FC players
Saudi First Division League players
Saudi Professional League players
Place of birth missing (living people)
Saudi Second Division players
Association football forwards
Saudi Arabian Shia Muslims